Mark Steven Rivituso (born September 20, 1961) is an American prelate of the Roman Catholic Church.  He has served as an auxiliary bishop for the Archdiocese of St. Louis in Missouri since 2017.

Biography

Early life 
Mark Rivituso was born September 20, 1961 in St. Louis, Missouri.  After attending Saint Mary High School in St.  Louis, he entered Cardinal Glennon College Seminary and Kenrick Seminary in St. Louis.

Priesthood 
Rivituso was ordained a priest for the Archdiocese of Saint Louis by Archbishop John L. May on January 16, 1988. After his ordination, Rivituso held the following pastoral assignments in Missouri parishes:

 Parochial vicar of Saint Ambrose in Saint Louis (1988-1990)
 Parochial vicar at Immaculate Conception in Dardenne Prairie (1990-1993); 
 Parish administrator of Saint Margaret of Scotland in St. Louis (1993-1994); 
 Parochial vicar of Saint Jerome in Bissell Hills (1996-2004); 
 Priest-in-residence at Saint Gabriel the Archangel in St. Louis (2004-2008).
 Pastor of Curé of Ars in Shrewsbury (2008-2013)
 Priest-in-residence at Annunciation in Webster Groves (2013-2020)

In addition to his pastoral assignments, Rivituso was a faculty member at Saint Dominic High School in O'Fallon, Missouri (1990-1993), then a member of the Metropolitan Court for one year.  Rivituso then went to Canada to attend Saint Paul University in Ottawa, Ontario, obtaining a Licentiate of Canon Law in 1996.  After returning to St. Louis in 1996, he rejoined the Metropolitan Court for the next eight years. 

Rivituso was appointed judicial vicar in 2005, then vicar general in 2011).  In 2005, he was named by the Vatican as a monsignor with the title of prelate of honor.

Auxiliary Bishop of St. Louis
Pope Francis appointed Rivituso as titular bishop of Turuzi and auxiliary bishop for the Archdiocese of St. Louis on March 7, 2017.  He was consecrated by Archbishop Robert Carlson on May 2 2017.

See also

 Catholic Church hierarchy
 Catholic Church in the United States
 Historical list of the Catholic bishops of the United States
 List of Catholic bishops of the United States
 Lists of patriarchs, archbishops, and bishops

References

External links

 Archdiocese of Saint Louis

 

1961 births
Living people
21st-century Roman Catholic bishops in the United States
Clergy from St. Louis
Roman Catholic Archdiocese of St. Louis
Kenrick–Glennon Seminary alumni
Saint Paul University alumni
Bishops appointed by Pope Francis